Ameera may refer to:

, a US Navy patrol vessel in commission from 1917 to 1919
Ameera Ali Aziz, a character on the television drama As the World Turns
Ameera al-Taweel (born 1983), Saudi Arabian princess and philanthropist

See also
Amira (disambiguation)